Robert Joseph Scott (August 31, 1922 – October 16, 2000) was an American bobsledder who competed in the early 1950s. He finished ninth in the four-man event at the 1952 Winter Olympics in Oslo.

References
1952 bobsleigh four-man results
Robert Scott's profile at Sports Reference.com

American male bobsledders
Olympic bobsledders of the United States
Bobsledders at the 1952 Winter Olympics
1922 births
2000 deaths